The Uplifters is a 1919 American silent comedy film directed by Herbert Blaché and starring May Allison, Pell Trenton, and Alfred Hollingsworth, and was released on June 30, 1919.

Cast list
May Allison as Hortense Troutt
Pell Trenton as Saul Shilpick, Jr.
Alfred Hollingsworth as Saul Shilpick, Sr.
Kathleen Kerrigan as Harriet Peebles Cull
Caroline "Spike" Rankin as Elsa
Howard Gaye as Larry Holden
Lois Wood as Larry's wife

References

External links 
 
 
 

Metro Pictures films
Films directed by Herbert Blaché
Films based on short fiction
American silent feature films
American black-and-white films
Silent American comedy films
1919 comedy films
1919 films
1910s American films